Jordana Pomeroy is an American Museum director, author and former curator. She is the director of the Patricia and Phillip Frost Art Museum in Miami.

Early life and education

Pomeroy is the daughter of architect Lee Harris Pomeroy and professor Sarah B. Pomeroy.

She grew up in New York City. She received her B.A. in art history from Bryn Mawr College in Pennsylvania and earned her Ph.D. in art history from Columbia University.

Career

Pomeroy started working as an intern at the Museum of Modern Art while she was in high school.

After graduate school, she worked at the National Museum of Women in the Arts as the chief curator, where she published notable catalogues including contemporary Scandinavian design and 16th century Renaissance art. Later, she became the Director at the Louisiana State University Museum of Art, teaching in the museum studies department. She has also taught in Georgetown University.

Pomeroy joined the Patricia and Phillip Frost Art Museum as a director in January 2015. At the museum, she has co-curated multiple exhibitions, including Narciso Rodriguez: An Exercise in Minimalism and Marking the Infinite: Contemporary Women Artists from Aboriginal Australia.

Selected works

Exhibitions 
Some of her notable exhibitions includes,
 An Imperial Collection: Women Artists from the State Hermitage Museum (2003)
 Nordic Cool: Hot Women Designers (2004)
 Italian Women Artists from Renaissance to Baroque (2007)
 Pressing Ideas: Fifty Years of Women’s Lithographs from Tamarind (2010)
 Royalists to Romantics: Women Artists from the Louvre, Versailles, and other French National Collections (2012)

Published works 

 Intrepid Women: Victorian Artists Travel
 Italian Women Artists: From Renaissance to Baroque
 An Imperial Collection: Women Artists from the State Hermitage Museum

References 

Living people
Bryn Mawr College alumni
Columbia University alumni
Date of birth missing (living people)
Museum directors
American curators
American women curators
Florida International University faculty
People from New York City
Year of birth missing (living people)